Dyken Pond is a  lake in the towns of Grafton and Berlin in Rensselaer County, New York. The pond gets water primarily from precipitation and outflows westward into the Poesten Kill, a tributary of the Hudson River. It is located in northwest Berlin, south of Grafton Lakes State Park.

Formerly a small pond, Dyken Pond was enlarged to its current size in 1902 after a dam was built to regulate water power and reduce flooding. The dam was constructed by the Manning Paper Company, who later donated their land holdings in the vicinity of the pond to Rensselaer County in 1973. That land became part of the Dyken Pond Environmental Education Center, a  property that is accessible to the public for the purpose of outdoor education and low-impact recreation.

The pond facilitates fishing for chain pickerel and panfish, and ice fishing is permitted.

References

External links
 Dyken Pond Environmental Education Center

Lakes of Rensselaer County, New York
Lakes of New York (state)
Protected areas of Rensselaer County, New York